The Filmfare Best Director Award is given by the Filmfare magazine as part of its annual Filmfare Awards South for Kannada (Sandalwood) films. The award was first given in 1972.

Superlatives

Winners

References

Director